Love Finds the Way (originally titled The Right to Happiness) is a three-act play written by Marguerite Merington and first performed in 1896. Theatrical manager A. M. Palmer acquired the rights to a German play by Olga Wohlbrück, which Merington adapted into English. The adaptation debuted at the Grand Opera House in Wilmington, Delaware on November 30, 1896, with actress Minnie Maddern Fiske in the lead role. The title was changed to Love Finds the Way for Broadway, where it opened at the Fifth Avenue Theatre on April 11, 1898, with A Bit of Old Chelsea by Mrs. Oscar Beringer as a curtain raiser. (Fiske starred in both plays.) Love Finds the Way is a comedy-drama about a young woman who seeks romance despite an injury that has left her unhappy and alienated from her family.

Cast and characters
The characters and cast from the Broadway production are given below:

References

External links

 

1896 plays
Broadway plays
Comedy-drama plays
English-language plays
Plays based on other plays